Scaeosopha hongkongensis is a species of moth of the family Cosmopterigidae. It is found in China.

The wingspan is about 13 mm. The ground colour of the forewings is yellow, covered with dense dark-brown scales and black spots. The hindwings are greyish brown.

Etymology
The species name refers to Hong Kong, the type locality.

References

Moths described in 2012
Scaeosophinae